Bar is the local season of the reality television series The Bar in Croatia. The show was started on 2 August 2005 and finished on 1 October 2005, with a duration of 61 days. Nova is the channel was aired. The presenter is Marin Ivanović, "Stoka".

Contestants

Nominations

References

Croatian reality television series
2005 Croatian television series debuts
2005 Croatian television series endings
Nova TV (Croatia) original programming